In set theory, a continuous function is a sequence of ordinals such that the values assumed at limit stages are the limits (limit suprema and limit infima) of all values at previous stages. More formally, let γ be an ordinal, and  be a γ-sequence of ordinals.  Then s is continuous if at every limit ordinal β < γ,

and

Alternatively, if s is an increasing function then s is continuous if s: γ → range(s) is a continuous function when the sets are each equipped with the order topology. These continuous functions are often used in cofinalities and cardinal numbers. 

A normal function is a function that is both continuous and increasing.

References
 Thomas Jech.  Set Theory, 3rd millennium ed., 2002, Springer Monographs in Mathematics,Springer, 

Set theory
Ordinal numbers